The Gray Race is the ninth full-length album of the punk rock band Bad Religion, which was released in 1996. It was the follow-up to the band's highly successful 1994 album Stranger Than Fiction.

This was the band's first album not recorded with original guitarist Brett Gurewitz (since the 1985 EP Back to the Known) and is their first release with Brian Baker, who replaced him during the Stranger Than Fiction tour.

Some songs on the album are considered fan favorites, such as, "Them And Us", "A Walk", "Punk Rock Song", "Spirit Shine", "Ten in 2010", "Come Join Us", and "Cease".

Although not as successful as Stranger Than Fiction, The Gray Race achieved modest success when MTV ran a commercial for the album during its release. The album was re-released by Epitaph Records on September 15, 2008.

Production and marketing

After the 10-month Stranger Than Fiction tour, frontman Graffin soon began writing songs for Stranger Than Fiction'''s follow-up. The band recorded it at Electric Lady Studios, New York City with producer Ric Ocasek (of The Cars, Bad Brains and Weezer fame). The recording lasted throughout much of October and November 1995.

ReceptionThe Gray Race was released on February 27, 1996 and peaked at #56 on the Billboard 200 album chart. It spawned the moderately successful single "A Walk" in the United States. In Europe, the album also reached the German charts at #6 as well as earn the group a gold record for sales in Scandinavia. Then-former and now current guitarist Brett Gurewitz disliked the album, however, and commented that it was "BR's worst-selling record to date" and described it as "uninspired."  He has since taken that back.

Track listing

Personnel
 Greg Graffin – lead vocals
 Greg Hetson – guitar
 Brian Baker – guitar, backing vocals
 Jay Bentley – bass, backing vocals
 Bobby Schayer – drums, percussion
 Ric Ocasek – production
 George Marino – mastering
 Bruce Calder – engineer
 Frank Gargiulo – art direction, design

Notes/Trivia
 Due to Gurewitz's departure a year before the album was recorded, all tracks for this album were written by Greg Graffin, though guitarist Brian Baker co-wrote 4 out of 15 of the songs.
 The track "Cease" was later re-recorded for Greg Graffin's 1997 solo album, American Lesion, this time as a piano and vocal arrangement. This version was played by Graffin on their 2006 DVD Live at the Palladium''.
 The album liner contains ten portraits of faces in black and white. Different versions exist, with different pictures as the front cover.
 The album would earn Bad Religion a gold record for sales in Scandinavia and reach # 6 on the German charts for the single "Punk Rock Song".
 The songs "Them and Us" and "Ten in 2010" were featured in the game Crazy Taxi.
 The album was re-released by Epitaph Records on September 15, 2008.

Charts

Weekly charts

Year-end charts

Sales and certifications

References

External links

The Gray Race at YouTube (streamed copy where licensed)

Bad Religion albums
1996 albums
Atlantic Records albums
Albums produced by Ric Ocasek
Albums recorded at Electric Lady Studios